S10 may refer to:

Automobiles 
 Chevrolet S-10, a pickup truck
 Nissan Silvia (S10), a sports car
 Toyota Crown (S10), a luxury car

Aviation 
 Lake Chelan Airport, in Chelan County, Washington, United States
 Letov Š-10, a Czech trainer aircraft
 Rans S-10 Sakota, an American aerobatic aircraft
 Sikorsky S-10, a Russian seaplane
 SIPA S.10, a French trainer aircraft
 Stemme S10, a self-launching sailplane

Electronics 
 Canon HF S10, a camcorder
 Canon PowerShot S10, a digital camera
 Lenovo IdeaPad S10, a netbook
 Nikon Coolpix S10, a digital camera
 Roland S-10, a sampler keyboard
 Samsung Galaxy S10, a smartphone by Samsung
 Siemens S10, a Siemens Mobile phone

Rail and transit

Lines 
 S10 (Berlin), a former S-Bahn line
 S10 (St. Gallen S-Bahn), an S-Bahn line in Switzerland
 S10 (TILO), a railway service in Switzerland and Italy
 S10 (ZVV), a line of the S-Bahn Zürich in Switzerland

Locomotives 
 ALCO S-10, a diesel-electric switcher
 Northern Pacific class S-10, a 4-6-0 locomotive class
 Oldenburg S 10, a 2-6-2 locomotive class
 Prussian S 10, a 4-6-0 locomotive class
 Sri Lanka Railways S10, a diesel multiple unit

Stations 
 Gokiso Station, in Shōwa-ku, Nagoya, Aichi Prefecture, Japan
 Hamacho Station, in Chūō, Tokyo, Japan
 Hoshimi Station, in Teine-ku, Sapporo, Hokkaido, Japan
 Itayado Station, in Suma-ku, Kobe, Hyōgo Prefecture, Japan
 Kushi Station, in Iyo, Ehime Prefecture, Japan
 Talat Phlu BTS station, in Bangkok, Thailand

Roads 
 Mühlviertler Schnellstraße, Austria
 S10 highway (Georgia)
 Expressway S10 (Poland)
 County Route S10 (California), United States

Vessels 
 
 , an armed yacht of the Royal Canadian Navy
 , a submarine of the United States Navy

Other uses 
 S 10 (Abydos), an ancient Egyptian tomb
 S10 (classification), a disability swimming classification
 S10 (singer) (born 2000), Dutch singer and rapper
 S10 (UPU standard), of the Universal Postal Union
 40S ribosomal protein S10
 S10 ribosomal protein leader
 S10 NBC Respirator, a gas mask
 S10, a postcode district in Sheffield, England